Laticauda frontalis is a sea snake in the family Elapidae first described by De Vis in 1905. It is native to waters off New Caledonia and Vanuatu.

References

frontalis
Reptiles described in 1905